The Lianjiang River, in ancient time known as Huang River, is a right-bank and the largest tributary of the North River in Guangdong. The river rises in Momianshi (磨面石) of Xingzi Town (星子镇) in Lianzhou county, and it runs generally northwest to southeast through Lianzhou, Yangshan and Yingde counties. It joins the Bei River at Jiangkouzui of Lianjiangkou Town (连江口镇), Yingde.

References

Rivers of Guangdong
Tributaries of the Pearl River (China)